Deopteryx is a genus of snout moths. It was described by Harrison Gray Dyar Jr. in 1914, and contains the species Deopteryx hypenetes. It is found in Panama.

References

Chrysauginae
Monotypic moth genera
Moths of Central America
Pyralidae genera